The Matanuska River (Dena'ina: Ch'atanhtnu; Ahtna: Ts'itonhna’) is a 75-mile (121 km) long river in Southcentral Alaska, United States. The river drains a broad valley south of the Alaska Range eponymously known as the Matanuska Valley.

Course
Formed by the confluence of its east and south forks, the Matanuska River flows generally southwest to the Knik Arm of Cook Inlet. Downstream of its source, the river is joined by meltwater from Matanuska Glacier in the northern Chugach Mountains. From there it continues through the Matanuska Valley, between the Chugach Mountains to the south and the Talkeetna Mountains to the north. Population centers along its course include Chickaloon, Sutton, Palmer, and Butte.

The Glenn Highway runs roughly parallel to the river for much of its length. Highway bridges over the river, listed from source to mouth, include Glacier Park Bridge, Chickaloon River Bridge, King River Bridge, Old Glenn Highway Bridge, and Glenn Highway Bridge. An Alaska Railroad bridge crosses the river parallel to the Glenn Highway Bridge at Palmer Hay Flats State Game Refuge. Mantanuska Glacier State Recreation Site is along the highway where Glacier Creek enters the river; King Mountain State Recreation Site is near Chickaloon, and Kepler – Bradley Lakes State Recreation Area is near Palmer.

In addition to the glacier, named and unnamed streams that drain the Talkeetna and Chugach ranges feed into the river. These include Glacier, Hicks, Purinton, Caribou, and Coal creeks, and the Chickaloon and King rivers, and many others. The main stem is silty with glacial run-off from spring through fall but at lower flows beneath winter ice, it runs relatively clear.

The Matanuska Valley is one of the most settled regions of Alaska and one of the few areas in the state to support agriculture. Erosion by the glacial braided river has damaged roads, farms, houses, and houses for decades.

Discharge
The United States Geological Survey operates a stream gauge near Palmer. The minimum recorded flow of  occurred on April 25, 1956.

Boating
The river is a popular destination for whitewater enthusiasts who float mainly in rafts or kayaks. Accessible at several bridges and other points along the Glenn Highway, the Matanuska varies from Class II (medium) to III (difficult) on the International Scale of River Difficulty. Expert paddlers sometimes run a tributary, Caribou Creek, that flows past Matanuska Glacier and is rated Class II to IV (very difficult). Hazards along the main stem include swift, cold water; big standing waves and holes along some sections; overhanging or submerged vegetation on the lower reaches, and upriver winds.

Etymology
The indigenous Dena'ina Athabascan name for the river is Ch'atanhtnu, based on the root -tanh "trail extends out", meaning literally "trail comes out river". The English place name Matanuska derives from a Russian term spelled in various ways, including "Matanooski" and "Mednoviska", and meaning "copper river people", perhaps referring to an implied route from Cook Inlet to the Copper River.

See also
List of rivers of Alaska
Matanuska Formation

References

Further reading 
 Kari, James M., et al. (2003) [1987]. Shem Pete's Alaska: The Territory of the Upper Cook Inlet Dena'ina, 2nd ed. Fairbanks, Alaska: University of Alaska Press.

External links

Rivers of Matanuska-Susitna Borough, Alaska
Rivers of Alaska